Farmer Township is one of the twelve townships of Defiance County, Ohio, United States. The 2010 census found 963 people in the township.

Geography
Located in the northwestern part of the county, it borders the following townships:
Center Township, Williams County - north
Pulaski Township, Williams County - northeast corner
Washington Township - east
Delaware Township - southeast corner
Mark Township - south
Hicksville Township - southwest corner
Milford Township - west
St. Joseph Township, Williams County - northwest corner

No municipalities are located in Farmer Township, although the unincorporated community of Farmer is located in the township's center.

Name and history
Farmer Township was originally called Lost Creek Township, and under the latter name was organized in 1836. The present name honors Nathan Farmer, an early settler. It is the only Farmer Township statewide.

Government
The township is governed by a three-member board of trustees, who are elected in November of odd-numbered years to a four-year term beginning on the following January 1. Two are elected in the year after the presidential election and one is elected in the year before it. There is also an elected township fiscal officer, who serves a four-year term beginning on April 1 of the year after the election, which is held in November of the year before the presidential election. Vacancies in the fiscal officership or on the board of trustees are filled by the remaining trustees.

Transportation
Two significant highways in Farmer Township are State Route 2, which travels from northeast to southwest through the western half of the township; and State Route 249, which travels east–west through the center of the township and is concurrent with State Route 2 for a short distance.

References

External links
County website

Townships in Defiance County, Ohio
Townships in Ohio